Discovered Again! is an album by American pianist Dave Grusin released in 1976, recorded for the Sheffield Lab label. It was originally a "direct to disc" recording. It was remastered and reissued on CD in Japan as Discovered Again! Plus with four bonus tracks. On the original vinyl, "Captain Bacardi" is misspelled as "Captain Bicardi".

Track listing
"A Child Is Born" (Thad Jones) - 3:46
"Keep Your Eye on the Sparrow" [Theme From "Baretta"] (Grusin, Morgan Ames) - 4:19
"Sun Song" (Grusin) - 4:40
"Captain Bacardi" (Antonio Carlos Jobim) - 2:36
"Three Cowboy Songs": "Git Along Little Dogies"/"The Colorado Trail"/"Cripple Creek Break-Down" (arranged by Grusin) - 14:16
"Adeus a Papai" (Grusin) - 2:21

Bonus tracks on CD reissue:
"Keep Your Eye on the Sparrow" [Alternative Take] - 4:20
"Sun Song" [Alternative Take] - 4:43
"3 Cowboy Songs: No. 1. Git Along Little Dogies" [Alternative Take] - 4:30
"3 Cowboy Songs: No. 2. The Colorado Trail" [Alternative Take] - 5:14

Personnel
Dave Grusin - piano, electric piano
Lee Ritenour - guitar
Ron Carter - bass
Harvey Mason - drums
Larry Bunker - vibes, percussion

References

1976 albums
Dave Grusin albums